This article lists the intelligence squadrons of the United States Air Force. The purpose of intelligence units is to collect and analyze information to assist Air Force commanders in their decisions.

Intelligence squadrons

References

See also
 List of United States Air Force squadrons

Intelligence Squadrons
Intelligence Squadrons